Affluence without Abundance: The Disappearing World of the Bushmen is a book by anthropologist James Suzman on the Bushmen of southern Africa based on his 25 years of experience in the field.

See also 

 Original affluent society

Further reading

External links 

 

San people
Bloomsbury Publishing books
Anthropology books
2017 non-fiction books
English non-fiction books
Books about South Africa